Valhall is a Norwegian doom metal band. The band is noted for having briefly had former Ulver drummer Erik Lancelot in their ranks, and for having Fenriz (of Darkthrone) as their main drummer.

Discography

Studio albums
1995 – Moonstoned (Head Not Found)
1997 – Heading for Mars (Head Not Found)
2009 – Red Planet (Housecore Records)

Demos
1988 – Castle of Death
1989 – Amalgamation
1990 – Trauma
1991 - Live
1991 – Pagan Token

References

External links
Valhall on Myspace

Norwegian doom metal musical groups
Musical groups established in 1987
1987 establishments in Norway
Musical groups from Oslo